Craiglie is a coastal rural locality in the Shire of Douglas, Queensland, Australia.

Geography 
Craiglie is bounded by the Cassowary Range to the southwest, Mowbray River to the southeast and the Coral Sea to the east. The Captain Cook Highway and the cane tramway to the Mossman sugar mill form part of its boundary with Port Douglas to the north.

Historically, Craiglie provided the connection between Port Douglas and The Bump Track which crossed the range. Although it no longer provides access over the range, it remains the access point to Port Douglas, where the Port Douglas Road joins the Captain Cook Highway and it remains a service centre for businesses serving the highway and Port Douglas as well as being an extension of the suburban areas in the south of Port Douglas.

There is also farming on the low-lying coastal areas, principally sugarcane.

History 
As the motivation for the development of the port at Port Douglas was to transport gold from the Hodgkinson Minerals Area, in 1877 Christie Palmerston created the Bump Track which passed over the Cassowary Range from (present day) Mowbray to (present day) Julatten. Coming from Port Douglas, the teamsters would camp at the base of the range at Four Mile (as Craiglie was then known) before tackling "The Bump". A village formed there to supply services needed by the teamsters, such as hotels, a blacksmith, a saddlery, and a butcher shop. The Bump Track was the only road access to Port Douglas until a coast road (now the Captain Cook Highway) was built to Cairns in 1933. Today the Mossman Mount Molloy Road provides a range crossing from the Captain Cook Highway at Shannonvale/Cassowary to Julatten, and The Bump Track is no longer in use (except for bushwalking and mountain biking).

Craiglea State School opened in 1888 and closed in 1928.

Education 
There are no schools in Craiglie. The nearest primary school is Port Douglas State School and the nearest secondary school is Mossman State High School.

References

External links 
 

Shire of Douglas
Coastline of Queensland
Localities in Queensland